Angus Crichton (born 5 February 1996) is an Australian professional rugby league footballer who plays as a  forward for the Sydney Roosters in the NRL and Australia at international level.

He previously played for the South Sydney Rabbitohs in the National Rugby League. He has played for New South Wales in State of Origin, the Prime Minister's XIII. He won the 2019 NRL Grand Final with the Sydney Roosters.

Background
Crichton was born in Temora, New South Wales, Australia.

He played his junior rugby league for the Young Cherrypickers, before switching to rugby union in his senior school years at The Scots College (Sydney). In 2013 he was selected in the New South Wales Schools First XV and the Australian Schoolboys XV.

Playing career

Early career
In 2013, Crichton played for the Australian Schoolboys rugby union team, while attending The Scots College. 

He spent some time back in rugby league with the Sydney Roosters' lower grade teams in 2014, before again playing for the Australian Schoolboys rugby union team that same year. On 31 October 2014, he signed a 2-year contract with the South Sydney Rabbitohs starting in 2015. 

In 2015, he played for the Rabbitohs' NYC team, before re-signing with them late in the year on a 2-year contract until the end of 2018.

2016
In 2016, Crichton graduated to the Rabbitohs' New South Wales Cup team, North Sydney Bears. 

In Round 19 of the 2016 NRL season, he made his NRL debut for the Rabbitohs against the Brisbane Broncos.

2017
The 2017 season was Crichton's breakout year where he earned rave reviews in an otherwise disappointing South Sydney side. He finished the season with 22 appearances and 7 tries including a hat-trick against the Gold Coast Titans.  On 18 December 2017, after much speculation over his future Crichton signed a 3-year deal to join South Sydney's arch rivals the Sydney Roosters on a three-year deal starting in The 2019 season.

2018
After recurring injuries to his left middle-finger, Crichton underwent surgery to amputate the top half of the digit in the preseason. On 28 May 2018, Crichton was named to make his debut for New South Wales off the interchange bench in Game 1 of the 2018 State of Origin series at Melbourne Cricket Ground.  Crichton played in all 3 matches for New South Wales as the blues won their first origin shield since 2014.

2019
Crichton made his debut for the Sydney Roosters against his former club South Sydney in Round 1 of the 2019 NRL season at the Sydney Cricket Ground which resulted in a 26-16 loss, Crichton was involved in a scuffle with Souths player Cody Walker in the second half where Walker called Crichton a "traitor".  Crichton scored his first try for the club in Round 4 against Brisbane at the same venue.  Crichton was later selected to play for New South Wales in Game 1 of the 2019 State of Origin series which New South Wales would go on to lose at Suncorp Stadium.  Crichton was subsequently one of the players dropped from the New South Wales team for Game 2. 

Crichton played for the Sydney Roosters in the club's 2019 NRL Grand Final victory over Canberra at ANZ Stadium.  It was Crichton's first premiership victory as a player and the club's second consecutive premiership victory.

On 7 October, Crichton was named at second row for the U23 Junior Australian side.

2020
On 22 February, Crichton played for the Sydney Roosters in their 2020 World Club Challenge victory defeating St Helens 20-12.

In round 5 of the 2020 NRL season, Crichton scored two tries as the Sydney Roosters defeated Canterbury-Bankstown 42-6 at Bankwest Stadium.

Crichton played in the 2020 State of Origin series playing all three games in the 2-1 series loss, coming off the bench in the first origin and then started the next two due to Captain Boyd Cordner suffering another head knock ruling him out of the series.

2021
During the Sydney Roosters shock defeat to Brisbane in round 11 of the 2021 NRL season, Crichton was placed on report for a high tackle. He was later suspended for two games.

Crichton played a total of 20 games for the Sydney Roosters in the 2021 NRL season including the club's two finals matches.  The Sydney Roosters would be eliminated from the second week of the finals losing to Manly 42-6.

2022
On 19 June, Crichton was selected by New South Wales for game two of the 2022 State of Origin series.  Crichton had previously not been selected for the opening match of the series.
In round 23, Crichton scored two tries in the Sydney Roosters 72-6 victory over the Wests Tigers.
In round 25, Crichton became the first player to score a try at the new Sydney Football Stadium as the Sydney Roosters defeated arch-rivals South Sydney 26-16.
In October he was named in the Australia squad for the 2021 Rugby League World Cup.
Crichton played for Australia in their 2021 Rugby League World Cup final victory over Samoa. During the second half of the match, Crichton was sent to the sin bin after hitting Samoa's Chanel Harris-Tavita with a raised forearm which left the player knocked out. When Crichton returned to the field, he dropped the ball over the line which cost his team a try scoring opportunity, however Australia would hold on to win the game 30-10.

2023
In February, it was announced that Crichton would be granted indefinite personal leave after it had been revealed he was diagnosed with Bipolar Disorder. Crichton's father released a statement which said “I can confirm today that Angus is under appropriate professional support and treatment for medically diagnosed bipolar disorder which he has been dealing with for sometime, He is full supported by his family, his management and the Sydney Roosters club as he works towards recovery, while no timeline has been set for his return to Rugby League, we will continue to trust his medical team and know those with the Rugby League community will respect his right to privacy during this time".

References

External links

Sydney Roosters profile
South Sydney Rabbitohs profile
NRL profile

1996 births
Living people
Australia national rugby league team players
Australian rugby league players
New South Wales Rugby League State of Origin players
South Sydney Rabbitohs players
North Sydney Bears NSW Cup players
Rugby league second-rows
Rugby league centres
Rugby league players from Temora, New South Wales
People educated at Scots College (Sydney)
Sydney Roosters players